Matthew "Matt" Fuller (born 31 January 1970) is a former professional rugby league footballer who played in the 1980s and 1990s.

Playing career
Fuller played for the Canterbury-Bankstown Bulldogs, St. George Dragons, South Sydney Rabbitohs, Western Reds, Wakefield Trinity Wildcats (Heritage № 1045) (two spells) (captain during second spell), and the Western Suburbs Magpies - making appearances everywhere in the forward pack.

In 1995 he was part of the inaugural Western Reds squad and later served as the club's captain.

On 26 September 1998, Fuller played at lock in Wakefield Trinity’s 24-22 victory over Featherstone Rovers in the 1998 First Division Grand Final at McAlpine Stadium, Huddersfield.

In 1999, Fuller joined Western Suburbs and made 21 appearances for the club as they finished last on the table claiming the wooden spoon.  Western Suburbs only managed to win 3 games all year in their final season as a first grade club.  Fuller played in Wests final ever game against Auckland at Campbelltown Stadium which ended in a 60-16 defeat.  The match would also prove to be Fuller's last game in first grade.

Post Playing career
Following a stint where he captained Wakefield Trinity to a premiership in the United Kingdom, Fuller returned to Western Australia to position himself as one of Perth’s leading health and fitness experts.

Fuller currently owns and manages the Fuller Fitness Training Centre. Self-employed gym owner/operator since 2001, Matt has grown and developed a successful and reputable training facility, where he has mentored over 15,000 personal training sessions.

Fuller's views and opinions are frequently sought from the media in relation to all matters health and fitness. More recently, Fuller has become a permanent fixture on 720 ABC Radio Perth as an expert commentator when the rugby league comes to Perth and is a regular panelist on League Talk with 91.3 SportFM.

References

External links

Fuller Fitness Training Centre
League Talk| 91.3 SportFM
WA Rugby League Past Players Re-Union
HIF Healthy Lifestyle Blog > Matt Fuller
Matt Fuller on| PRIMOlife 
Royal Life Saving Society WA - Swim and Survive
Matt Fuller on the ride of his life - Telethon The West Australian
Man in the saddle: epic Telethon ride - Sydney Morning Herald

1970 births
Living people
Australian rugby league players
Canterbury-Bankstown Bulldogs players
Rugby league hookers
Rugby league locks
Rugby league players from Sydney
South Sydney Rabbitohs players
St. George Dragons players
Wakefield Trinity captains
Wakefield Trinity players
Western Reds players
Western Suburbs Magpies players